Alex Covelo Lafita (born 19 May 1978), is a Spanish football coach and former player who played as a goalkeeper.

Playing career
Born in Barcelona, Catalonia, Covelo played for the youth sides of UE Sant Andreu and FC Barcelona. He made his senior debut with CE L'Hospitalet's reserve team CE L'Hospitalet Atlètic before being promoted to the first team for the 1998–99 season.

Covelo subsequently represented Tercera División sides UE Cornellà, CE Europa and CE Premià.

Coaching career
While playing for Premià, Covelo also worked as a fitness coach for CF Badalona. He was under the same role at Greek side Aris Thessaloniki FC during the 2006–07 season before returning to his previous club.

Covelo joined RCD Espanyol's Juvenil A side in 2008, as a fitness coach. He left in July 2013, and joined Fernando de Argila's staff at San Marino Calcio, as his assistant.

On 16 May 2014, Covelo was appointed manager of San Marino, but was sacked on 10 November after 12 matches. After working as a football instructor for a period, he took over hometown side Atlètic Sant Just in 2016.

In January 2017, Covelo was named in charge of CE Sabadell FC's Juvenil squad, but left the side on 13 April. Twelve days later, he was hired as a Director of Methodology at Major League Soccer club San Jose Earthquakes.

Covelo also worked as an assistant coach of the Quakes on two different occasions, under interim managers Chris Leitch and Steve Ralston in 2017 and 2018, respectively. Ahead of the 2022 season, he was named manager of San Jose Earthquakes II as the club started a team to play in the MLS Next Pro.

On 19 April 2022, after Argentine coach Matias Almeyda left the team on mutual consent, Covelo was appointed interim coach of the team. Despite the appointment of Luchi Gonzalez as the new head coach on 17 August, it was announced that Covelo would remain as an interim until the end of the season.

References

1978 births
Living people
People from Baix Llobregat
Sportspeople from the Province of Barcelona
Spanish footballers
Footballers from Catalonia
Association football goalkeepers
CE L'Hospitalet players
UE Cornellà players
CE Europa footballers
CE Premià players
Spanish football managers
RCD Espanyol non-playing staff
A.S.D. Victor San Marino managers
San Jose Earthquakes non-playing staff
Major League Soccer coaches
San Jose Earthquakes coaches
Spanish expatriate sportspeople in Greece
Spanish expatriate sportspeople in Italy
Spanish expatriate sportspeople in the United States
Expatriate football managers in Italy
Expatriate soccer managers in the United States